Jörg or Joerg is a German name, equivalent to George in English.

 Jörg Bergmeister (born 1976), German race car driver
 Jörg Frischmann, German Paralympian athlete
 Jörg Haider (1950–2008), Austrian politician
 Jörg Andrees Elten (also Swami Satyananda; 1927–2017), German journalist and writer, follower of Osho
 Jörg Kachelmann (born 1958), Swiss journalist and presenter 
 Joerg Kalt (1967–2007), Austrian film director and cinematographer
 Jörg Meuthen (born 1961), German politician 
 Jörg Nobis (born 1975), German politician 
 Jörg Pilawa (born 1965), German television presenter 
 Joerg Rieger (born 1963), American professor
 Jörg Schneider (actor) (1935–2015), Swiss actor

See also
 
Jörgen (disambiguation)
Joerg Peninsula of Graham Land, Antarctica
W. L. G. Joerg (1885–1952), American geographer and in particular expert in the geography of the Arctic and Antarctic regions
Norton C. Joerg, lawyer and retired Read Admiral in the United States Navy

German masculine given names